Draževo may refer to:
 Draževo, Novo Selo, North Macedonia
 Draževo (Bela Palanka), Serbia